The Line 2 of Taiyuan Metro is the first line in Taiyuan, as well as the first line in Shanxi. The line opened on December 26, 2020.

Opening timeline

Stations 
Huazhangxijie station is not opened.

Construction 
Line 2 began construction on March, 2016, as of July 2020, construction of all 23 stations are complete. 

In phase 1, it has a total length of 23.647 km, 23 stations, 2 electrical stations and 1 control centre.

Security 
There will be 3,500 cameras installed during Phase 1 alone, Dananmen Station (大南门站), a major interchange station, has 231 cameras installed. All trains are unmanned and equipped with state-of-the-art technology.

References 

Taiyuan
Rapid transit lines in China
Rail transport in Shanxi
Railway lines opened in 2020